Radio Studio D is a Bosnian local commercial radio station, broadcasting from Srebrenik, Bosnia and Herzegovina. This radio station broadcasts a variety of programs such as music and local news.

Program is mainly produced in Bosnian language at two FM frequencies and it is available in the city of Srebrenik as well as in nearby municipalities in Tuzla Canton and Zenica-Doboj area.

Radio Studio D was founded on 4 September 1997. The owner of the local radio station is the company Primat Plus d.o.o. Srebrenik which also operates cable television channel TATABRADA.

Estimated number of listeners of Radio Studio D is around 176.010.

Frequencies
 Srebrenik 
 Banovići

See also 
 List of radio stations in Bosnia and Herzegovina
 Radio Srebrenik
 Radio Gračanica
 Radio Gradačac
 Radio Tuzla
 Radio Slon
 Radio BIR

References

External links 
 www.studiod.ba
 www.radiostanica.ba
 www.fmscan.org
 Communications Regulatory Agency of Bosnia and Herzegovina
Mass media in Srebrenik
Srebrenik
Radio stations established in 1997